Gonystylus costalis is a species of plant in the Thymelaeaceae family. It is a tree endemic to Borneo where it is confined to Sarawak.

References

costalis
Endemic flora of Borneo
Trees of Borneo
Flora of Sarawak
Vulnerable plants
Taxonomy articles created by Polbot
Plants described in 1969